The 60th Fighter Wing (60 FW) was a reserve fighter wing of the United States Air Force, stationed at Felts Field, Spokane, Washington from 1947-1950. It was withdrawn from the Washington Air National Guard (WA ANG) and inactivated on 31 October 1950.

This wing is not related to the 60th Troop Carrier Wing, Medium, or subsequent units that was constituted and activated on 1 July 1948.

History
The 60th Troop Carrier Wing was controlled Army Air Bases training replacement personnel being assigned to troop carrier groups and glider units fighting overseas. Inactivated at the end of the war.

In 1946 the wing was redesignated as a Fighter Wing, and allocated to the Washington Air National Guard to control ANG fighters in Washington and Oregon. It was extended federal recognition and activated on 7 December 1947. At the end of October 1950, the Air National Guard converted to the wing-base Hobson Plan organization. As a result, the wing was withdrawn from the Washington ANG and was inactivated on 31 October 1950.  The 142d Fighter Wing was established by the National Guard Bureau, allocated to the state of Oregon, recognized and activated 1 November 1950; assuming the personnel, equipment and mission of the inactivated 60th Fighter Wing.

Lineage 
 Constituted as 60th Troop Carrier Wing on 5 June 1943
 Activated on 12 June 1043
 Inactivated on 8 October 1945
 Re-designated 60th Fighter Wing, and allotted to the Washington ANG on 24 May 1946
 Extended federal recognition and activated on 7 December 1947
 Inactivated, and returned to the control of the Department of the Air Force, on 31 October 1950
 Disbanded on 15 June 1983

Assignments 
 I Troop Carrier Command, 12 June 1943 – 8 October 1945
 Washington Air National Guard, 7 December 1947 – 31 October 1950

Components 
 116th Fighter Squadron, 1 July-30 August 1946 (Washington ANG)
 142d Fighter Group, 30 August 1946 – 31 October 1950 (Oregon ANG)

Stations
 Sedalia Army Air Field, Missouri, 12 June 1943
 Pope Field, North Carolina, 22 July 1943
 Laurinburg-Maxton Army Air Base, North Carolina, c. 20 December 1943
 Pope Field, North Carolina, C. 8 March 1944 – 8 October 1945.
 Felts Field, Washington, 7 December 1947 – 31 October 1950

References

 Maurer, Maurer (1983). Air Force Combat Units of World War II. Maxwell AFB, Alabama: Office of Air Force History. .

0060
060
Military units and formations established in 1947
Military units and formations disestablished in 1950